The 1975–76 Denver Nuggets season was Denver's ninth and final season in the American Basketball Association (ABA). At the conclusion of the season the team would join the National Basketball Association (NBA). The team was led by an eventual hall of fame coach, Larry Brown.

ABA Draft

Season standings

Player stats
Note: PG= per game; M= Minutes; R= Rebounds; A= Assists; S = Steals; B = Blocks; P = Points; T = Turnovers; PF = Personal fouls

Roster

Playoffs

Semifinals

Nuggets win series, 4–3

ABA Finals

Nuggets lose series 4-2

Awards, records, and honors
 Ralph Simpson led the league in turnovers (360)
 Bobby Jones led the league in field goal percentage (.581)

ABA All-Stars
 Byron Beck
 Roger Brown
 James Foster
 Gus Gerard
 Dan Issel
 Bobby Jones
 Ralph Simpson
 Claude Terry
 David Thompson
 Monte Towe
 Chuck Williams

All-ABA Teams
 Ralph Simpson- 1st team
 Don Buse- 2nd team
 Bobby Jones- 2nd team
 David Thompson- 2nd team

All-Defensive Team
 Don Buse- 1st team
 Bobby Jones- 1st team

All-Rookie Team
 David Thompson

References

Denver
Denver Nuggets seasons
Denver Nuggets
Denver Nuggets